The American National Design Awards, founded in 2000, are funded and awarded by Cooper-Hewitt, Smithsonian Design Museum. There are seven official design categories, and three additional awards. Supplemental awards can be given at the discretion of the jury or institution.

The seven official design categories are:

Architecture Design
Communications Design
Fashion Design (created in 2003)
Interior Design (created in 2005)
Interaction Design (created for 2009)
Landscape Design 
Product Design

The three additional awards categories are:

Lifetime Achievement
Design Patron (created in 2001)
Design Mind (created in 2005)

The supplemental categories include: 
People's Design Award (created in 2006)
Special Commendation (Awarded in 2008)
Special Jury Commendation (created in 2005, but omitted in 2008)
American Original (Awarded in 2000 and 2002 only)

Selection criteria

The selection criteria for all of the awards are excellence, innovation, and enhancement of the quality of life.  Individual candidates must be citizens or long-term residents of the United States and have been practicing design for at least 7 years.  Corporations and institutions must have their headquarters in the United States.  Honorees are selected for a body of realized work, not for any one specific project.

Candidates are proposed by an official Nominating Committee and are invited to submit materials for a jury's review.  Submissions consist of resumes, portfolios, publications by and about the candidates, and professional-quality audio-visual samples.

Jury

The jurors are chosen by the museum based on their prominence and expertise in the design world.  Once selected, jurors are briefed on the Museum mission and criteria for the Awards.  Decisions are asked to be based on the core criteria: excellence, innovation, and contribution to the quality of life. Museum staff does not enter into the selection process.

The jury meets over a two-day period to thoroughly review every submission.  The submissions are assessed in terms of the work's relationship to and impact on contemporary life.  Special emphasis is placed on the extent to which the nominee's designs and achievements have benefit the general public.

Purpose

The annual Awards program celebrates design in various disciplines as a vital humanistic tool in shaping the world, and seeks to increase national awareness of design by educating the public and promoting excellence, innovation, and lasting achievement.

The National Design Awards is one of the few programs of its kind structured to continue to benefit the nation long after the Awards ceremony and gala.  A suite of educational programs is offered every year in conjunction with the Awards by the Cooper-Hewitt, National Design Museum's Education Department.  These programs include: lectures, round-tables, workshops, and fairs based on the vision and work of the Awards' winners.

People's Design Award

In 2006, the first ever People's Design Award was created in order to give the general public a chance to nominate and vote for their favorite design. Individuals can nominate and vote for their favorite designers via the official website.

Recipients

External links
National Design Awards Gallery
Cooper-Hewitt, National Design Museum
People's Design Award
Smithsonian Institution

References

Design awards
Design Awards, National
Awards established in 2000
Design Awards, National
2000 establishments in the United States